Jeffrey Mark Neubauer (born January 27, 1971) is an American college basketball coach and the former head men's basketball coach at Fordham University.  He was hired on March 30, 2015. He was fired on January 26, 2021. He is the former coach of Eastern Kentucky University.

Playing career
Born in Gainesville, Florida, Neubauer played college basketball at La Salle University for head coach Speedy Morris.  The 1989–90 Explorers went 30–2 and earned an NCAA tournament berth in Neubauer's freshman season.  La Salle accumulated two more postseason berths and an overall record of 83–36 during his four years on the squad. Neubauer served as a team captain as a senior and earned honorable mention GTE All-Academic accolades as a cum laude graduate in finance in 1993.

Head coaching record

References

External links
 Fordham profile

1971 births
Living people
American men's basketball coaches
American men's basketball players
Basketball coaches from Florida
Basketball players from Gainesville, Florida
College men's basketball head coaches in the United States
Eastern Kentucky Colonels men's basketball coaches
Fordham Rams men's basketball coaches
La Salle Explorers men's basketball players
Richmond Spiders men's basketball coaches
Sportspeople from Gainesville, Florida
The Citadel Bulldogs basketball coaches
West Virginia Mountaineers men's basketball coaches